Brendan O’Donnell (born June 25, 1992) is a Canadian professional ice hockey forward. He is currently playing under contract with Düsseldorfer EG in the Deutsche Eishockey Liga (DEL)

Playing career
O'Donnell was drafted 156th overall by the Tampa Bay Lightning in the 2010 NHL Entry Draft. After four seasons with the University of North Dakota Fighting Hawks, he signed with the Florida Everblades of the ECHL on October 8, 2015. During his second season, he scored 41 goals and 80 points in 61 games for the Everblades. He also had a short stint in the American Hockey League with the Texas Stars in 2017, with whom he played six games.

O'Donnell then moved to Chinese club Kunlun Red Star of the Kontinental Hockey League, playing 25 games and registering two assists. On August 19, 2018, O'Donnell joined KooKoo of Liiga. He played just three games for the team however and departed two months later to join the Dornbirn Bulldogs of the Erste Bank Eishockey Liga where he scored 33 goals in 43 games.

O'Donnell signed with Rytíři Kladno of the Czech Extraliga on June 28, 2019. He scored 14 goals in 51 games for Kladno as the team suffered relegation to the Change Liga. On August 3, 2020, O'Donnell joined HC Slovan Bratislava of the Tipos Extraliga.

Career statistics

References

External links

 

1992 births
Living people
Canadian ice hockey forwards
Dornbirn Bulldogs players
Düsseldorfer EG players
Florida Everblades players
Rytíři Kladno players
KooKoo players
KRS Heilongjiang players
HC Kunlun Red Star players
North Dakota Fighting Hawks men's ice hockey players
Penticton Vees players
HC Slovan Bratislava players
Ice hockey people from Winnipeg
Tampa Bay Lightning draft picks
Texas Stars players
Winnipeg South Blues players
Canadian expatriate ice hockey players in the United States
Canadian expatriate ice hockey players in China
Canadian expatriate ice hockey players in Slovakia
Canadian expatriate ice hockey players in Germany
Canadian expatriate ice hockey players in Austria
Canadian expatriate ice hockey players in the Czech Republic